{{Infobox settlement

| name                    = Kebbi
| official_name           =
| type                    = State
| image_skyline           = SAN 7773 04 (Fulani Family).jpg
| image_alt               =
| image_caption           =
| image_flag              =
| flag_alt                = Flag of Kebbi State
| image_seal              = Seal of Kebbi State.png
| seal_alt                = Seal of Kebbi State
| nickname                = Land of Equity
| image_map               = Nigeria Kebbi State map.png
| map_alt                 =
| map_caption             = Location of Kebbi State in Nigeria
| coordinates             = 
| coor_pinpoint           =
| coordinates_footnotes   =
| subdivision_type        = Country
| subdivision_name        = 
| established_title       = Date created
| established_date        = 27 August 1991
| seat_type               = Capital
| seat                    = Birnin Kebbi
| government_footnotes    =

| governing_body          = Government of Kebbi State
| leader_party            = APC
| leader_title            = Governor  (List)
| leader_name             = Abubakar Atiku Bagudu 
| leader_title1           = Deputy Governor
| leader_name1            = Samaila Yombe Dabai (APC)
| leader_title2           = Legislature
| leader_name2            = Kebbi State House of Assembly
| leader_title3           = Senators
| leader_name3            = 
| leader_title4           = Representatives
| leader_name4            = List
| unit_pref               = Metric
| area_footnotes          =
| area_total_km2          = 36800
| area_rank               = 10th of 36
| area_note               =
| elevation_footnotes     =
| elevation_m             =
| population_footnotes    =
| population_total        = 3,256,541
| population_as_of        = 2006 census
| population_rank         = 22nd of 36
| population_density_km2  = auto
| population_note         =
| population_demonym      = Kebbian
| demographics_type1      = GDP (PPP)
| demographics1_footnotes =
| demographics1_title1    = Year
| demographics1_info1     = 2007
| demographics1_title2    = Total
| demographics1_info2     = $3.29 billion
| demographics1_title3    = Per capita
| demographics1_info3     = $993
| timezone1               = WAT
| utc_offset1             = +01
| postal_code_type        = postal code
| postal_code             =860001
| area_code_type          =
| area_code               =
| iso_code                = NG-KE
| blank_name_sec1         = HDI (2018)
| blank_info_sec1         = 0.339 · 37th of 37
| website                 = kebbistate.gov.ng
| footnotes               =
Named for the city of Birnin Kebbi—the state's capital and largest city, Kebbi state was formed from Sokoto state on 27 August 1991. Of the 36 states of Nigeria, Kebbi is the tenth largest in area and 22nd most populous, with an estimated population of about 4.4 million as of 2016. The state is known as land of equity.

Geographically, the state is within the tropical West Sudanian savanna ecoregion. Important geographic features of Kebbi state include the Sokoto River, which flows through Kebbi into the River Niger, which continues south before reaching the Kainji Lake, half of which is in Kebbi. Among the state's nature are a number of fish species exhibited during the massive Argungu Fishing Festival, along with hippopotamus, West African manatee, and transient African bush elephant populations.

Ethnically, Kebbi state is inhabited by various ethnic groups, with the Fulani, Hausa, and Zarma peoples living throughout the state, while the Achipa (Achipawa), Boko-Bala, Dendi, Dukawa, Kambari, Kamuku, Lela, Puku, and Shanga peoples live along the state's diverse western and southern borders. Religiously, the majority of the state's population (~80%) are Muslims with smaller Christian and traditionalist minorities at about 10% each, respectively.

In the pre-colonial period, the area that is now Kebbi state was mainly controlled by the Kebbi Kingdom, a Hausa Banza bakwai state, until the early 1800s, the Fulani jihad seized part of the area and attempted to incorporate it into the Gwandu Emirate under the Sokoto Caliphate. Over the succeeding century, Kebbi rulers fought Sokoto on-and-off until the 1900s and 1910s, when the British seized control of the area as a part of the Northern Nigeria Protectorate, which later merged into British Nigeria, before becoming independent as Nigeria in 1960. Originally, modern-day Kebbi state was a part of the post-independence Northern Region until 1967, when the region was split and the area became part of the North-Western state. After the North-Eastern state was split, Sokoto state was formed in 1976 alongside ten other states. Twenty years afterward, a group of LGAs in Sokoto state's west and south was broken off to form the new Kebbi state.

Economically, Kebbi state is largely based around fishing and agriculture, mainly of sorghum, groundnuts, millet, onion, and rice crops. Other key industries are trading, especially in the city of Birnin Kebbi, and the livestock herding of camels, cattle, goats, and sheep. Kebbi state has the lowest Human Development Index and sixth lowest GDP in the country.

History
Kebbi state is traditionally considered by Sarki mythology as the homeland of the Banza bakwai states and Hausa kingdoms. A major local event was the conquest by Songhai in the second half of the fifteenth century CE.

Kebbi resisted the Fulani jihad of the early 19th-century, but in the later 19th-century, the area largely converted to Islam through peaceful means.

 History of Zuru 
Zuru emirate is divided into five administrative chiefdom: Dabai, Danko, Fakai, Sakaba, and Wasagu. The third class chief, who is also member of the Zuru town in Dabai chiefdom, where the emirate headquarters is located, heads each of the towns. Zuru Emirate is located in the southern part of Kebbi state Nigeria, occupying an area of about 9000sq km. It is bordered by Gummi in Zamfara state in the North. To the south is Niger state, this borderline extends also arbitrarily on land to the west, to a point where it ends a few kilometers to the west of large tributary of the Dan Zari River, a northwest ward protrusion of Yauri Emirate of Kebbi.

In fact, going by history, Zuru people being multi-ethic are grouped into categories. The first category is of those that claim long term settlement and the second category is of the much more recent settlers, who in fact regard themselves – and are also regarded by the others as recent immigrants or even as temporary strangers.
In the first category are the Achifawa, Kambari, Dukkawa Fakkawa,'Dankawa, Worawa, Katsinawa and Lelna (Dakarkari' such as sindawa').It is characteristic to find that some of them lay claim to have originated from the Hausas. Zuru as was said, is a result of upheaval, resulting from events such as Kanta's breakaway from Songhai and Nupe-Kororofa control. Moreover, the Katsinawa, who in fact see themselves as immigrants from the old state of Katsina, which had made political in road Zuru region, especially from the 16th century A.D. onward, and had enabled them to settle and to area's indigenous population.

Subdivisions

Kebbi state was created out of the former Sokoto state on 17 August 1991. The state has a total population of 3,137,989 people as projected from the 1991 census, within 21 local government areas.

The state has Sudan and Sahel-savannah. The southern part is generally rocky with the Niger River traversing the state from Benin to Ngaski LGA. The northern part of the state is sandy with the Rima River passing through Argungu to Bagudo LGA, where it empties into the Niger. Agriculture is the main occupation of the people, especially in the rural areas. Crops produced are mainly grains. Animal rearing and fishing are also common. Christianity and Islam are the dominant religions of the people. There are 225 political wards, 3,000 settlements and 1,036 hard to reach settlements in the 21 local government areas in the state.

Local Government Areas

Kebbi state consists of 21 Local Government Areas (LGAs), four emirate councils (Gwandu, Argungu, Yauri and Zuru), and 35 districts. The LGAs are as follows:

 Aleiro
 Arewa Dandi
 Argungu
 Augie
 Bagudo
 Birnin Kebbi
 Bunza
 Dandi
 Fakai
 Gwandu
 Jega
 Kalgo
 Koko/Besse
 Maiyama
 Ngaski
 Sakaba
 Shanga
 Suru
 Wasagu
 Yauri
 Zuru

Demographics

Kebbi state is mainly populated by the Hausa people, with some members of Zarma, Fulani, Lelna (Dakarkari), Bussawa (generally speakers of Busa), Dukawa, Kambari, Gungawa and Kamuku ethnic communities.

Most people who live in Kebbi are Muslims.

 Climate 
Like other Nigerian states, Kebbi state is also characterised with the tropical weather conditions of coldness, wetness and harmattan. The annual rainfall of Kebbi state has the average of 787.53 and 112.21mm, since rainfall is a climatic resource in the state, which aids agricultural production. The rainy season in the state is between mid-May and mid-September, while the dry season constitutes a period of seven months. The temperature of Kebbi state has an annual variation between 650F and 1040F. The cloud of Kebbi state is clearer around November to March of the succeeding month, while he state is usually cloudy between March and November at 68% annually. There is a relatively high humidity between seven months, April and November of every year, with November to July being the windiest.

Languages
The Hausa language is dominant throughout the State. Below is a list of some languages of Kebbi state listed by LGA:

Other languages spoken in Kebbi state include Fulfulde, Ut-Hun, and Sorko.

 Government 

Like the majority of Nigerian states, Kebbi state is governed by a governor and a State House of Assembly, under the current administration of Abubakar Atiku Bagudu.

Agriculture 

Kebbi state is one of the major producers of rice in Nigeria. The current participation of more than 70,000 farmers in the Anchor Borrowers Rice and wheat farming, is heading towards making Kebbi state a new destination and hub for agro-based commodities of the country.

To reiterate his commitment to ensure that Kebbi state is not only dependent on federal government allocation, the active governor of the state, Abubakar Atiku Bagudu paid a visit to Benin Republic last year and while on the trip, signed a number of bilateral trade protocols with the government and business community of Benin Republic with a view to fostering trade, industrial and tourism relationships with the country.

Abubakar Atiku Bagudu is also the Chairman, National Task Force on Rice and Wheat Production in Nigeria.

Tertiary learning institutions
The tertiary institutions of learning in Kebbi state, both federal government owned, state owned and private institutions are listed this:
 Federal University, Birnin kebbi
 Federal University of Agriculture, Zuru

 Kebbi State University of Science and Technology, Aliero

 Waziri Umaru Federal Polytechnic Birnin Kebbi
 Kebbi State Polytechnic Dakin Gari
 Adamu Augie College of Education, Argungu
 Kebbi State College of Nursing and Midwives Birnin Kebbi.
 Kebbi State College of Health Sciences and Technology, Jega
 Kebbi State College of Basic and Advance Studies, Yauri
 Sajo College of Nursing Sciences, Birnin Kebbi

 Natural resources 
Kebbi state has many natural resources which boost the economy of the state and enhances the availability of raw materials for industrial purposes, these include:

 Gold
 Clay
 Quartz
 Magnesite
 Manganese
 Iron
 Copper
 Aluminium

Major incidents
Kebbi boat disaster on 26 May 2021.

Bandit attacks
Kebbi  state is badly affected by the Nigerian bandit conflict. Banditory attacks in the state include the 2021 Kebbi massacre on 3 June 2021, the Kebbi kidnapping on 24 June 2021, the Dankade massacre on 14-15 January 2022 and the 2022 Kebbi massacres on 8 March of the same year.

See also
 Kebbi Emirate
 Argungu Fishing Festival

References

 Bibliography 
 Blench, Roger. 2020. Kebbi State: cultural briefing.
 Harris, P. G.: Sokoto Provincial Gazetteer, Sokoto 1938 [Cyclostyled].
 Hogben, S. J. and A. H. M. Kirk-Greene: The Emirates of Northern Nigeria'', London 1966.
 Lange, Dierk: "An Assyrian successor state in West Africa: The ancestral kings of Kebbi as ancient Near Eastern rulers", Anthropos, 104, 2 (2009), 359–382.

External links
 KebbiState.com
 Uhola Festival

 
States and territories established in 1991
States of Nigeria